Villa Vista Airport  is an airport serving the lightly populated cattle ranching area of Montaño in the Beni Department of Bolivia.

See also

Transport in Bolivia
List of airports in Bolivia

References

External links
OpenStreetMap - Villa Vista
OurAirports - Villa Vista Montano Airport
Google Maps - Bella Vista farm

Airports in Beni Department